Mona Mahmud El-Hawary (born November 3, 1962, in Cairo) is an Egyptian sport shooter. At age forty-six, El-Hawary made her official debut for the 2008 Summer Olympics in Beijing, where she competed in women's skeet shooting. She placed last out of nineteen shooters in the qualifying rounds of the event, with a total score of 50 points.

At the 2012 Summer Olympics in London, El-Hawary improved her performance from the previous games by hitting a total of 51 targets in women's skeet, finishing in seventeenth place only six points behind Cyprus' Panagiota Andreou.

El-Hawary is also a member of the Cairo Shooting Club, and is coached and trained by Lloyd Woodhouse.

References

External links
ISSF Profile
NBC Olympics Profile

1962 births
Living people
Egyptian female sport shooters
Olympic shooters of Egypt
Shooters at the 2008 Summer Olympics
Shooters at the 2012 Summer Olympics
Sportspeople from Cairo
21st-century Egyptian women